The Hwasong-12 (KN-17 under the U.S. naming convention) is a mobile intermediate-range ballistic missile developed by North Korea. The Hwasong-12 was first revealed to the international community in a military parade on 14 April 2017 celebrating the Day of the Sun which is the birthday anniversary of North Korea's founding President, Kim Il-sung. North Korea tested Hwasong-12 on 30 January 2022.

Design

Based on photos of the launch on 14 May 2017, the Hwasong-12 appears to be a single stage design, using a single main engine along with four vernier engines. The arrangement appears similar to the "high-thrust" engine test conducted in March 2017. Alternatively, it could be based on the engine used in the older Hwasong-10 with the addition of two more verniers.

In the April 2017 military parade the Hwasong-12 was displayed on the Hwasong-10 mobile launcher, and it may be intended to replace the similarly performing Hwasong-10 which has been shown unreliable during its test program.

Hwasong-8 

On the morning of 27 September 2021, a Hwasong-8 missile was launched in Ryongrim County, although it was reportedly fitted with a manoeuvrable reentry vehicle, which would achieve hypersonic speed. Ankit Panda, a senior fellow at the Carnegie Endowment for International Peace, stated that the new missile looked like the booster of Hwasong-12 upon inspection of the sole image of the missile, but more images would be needed to confirm it. This was one of the five 'most important' weapons laid out in a five year plan in the 8th Congress of the Workers' Party of Korea, where the development of the missile was reported to have already been completed. State media of North Korea described it as a weapon of great strategic significance.

The missile apparently flew on a depressed trajectory, reaching an apogee of 30 km and a range of 200 km, although it is likely that a part of the missile's path would have been untraceable with radar due to its ability to manoeuvre. The test reportedly confirmed its navigational control and stability, as well as the guiding manoeuvrability and flight characteristics of the detached hypersonic gliding warhead. However, the missile allegedly failed to actually achieve hypersonic flight, with South Korean intelligence determining it only reached Mach 2.5-3, whereas hypersonic weapons are considered to travel at a speed of at least  although actual data on the flight was not publicly released. The South Korea Joint Chiefs of Staff (JCS) assessed that the Hwasong-8 was at an early stage of development and would take a "considerable period of time" until it could be deployed in combat. North Korea also stated that the missile was launched through "ampulization," where the liquid fuel is sealed in the launch canister. This allows the fuel to be stored for years and eliminates the need to conduct fueling before launch, reducing preparation time needed before firing, although the JCS still claimed a 'significant amount of time' was needed to deploy the missile.

List of Hwasong-12 tests

Technical specifications

Current operators

See also 
R-27 Zyb
Pukkuksong-1
JL-1
KN-08
Hwasong-10
Hwasong-14

References

External links
CSIS Missile Threat - Hwasong-12

Ballistic missiles of North Korea
Intermediate-range ballistic missiles of North Korea
Military equipment introduced in the 2010s